Kherla Bujurg is a town in Dausa district in the Indian state of Rajasthan.  This town is located on Mahua-Hindaun road,  from Mahua. According to the 2011 census it has a population of 4946 living in 898 households. Its main agriculture product is wheat.

References

Cities and towns in Dausa district